Mark Kaplan (born 20 December 1967) is a South African tennis player. The right-hander reached his highest ATP singles ranking of 117 on 25 June 1990. He also reached a career high doubles ranking of 219. In college his doubles partner was Richard Lubner.

ATP career finals

Singles: 1 (1 runner-up)

ATP Challenger and ITF Futures finals

Singles: 3 (2–1)

Doubles: 2 (1–1)

Performance timeline

Singles

References

External links
 
 

1967 births
Living people
South African male tennis players
UC Irvine Anteaters men's tennis players